Müjdat Gürsu (13 September 1971 in Silivri, İstanbul – 21 June 1994 in Antalya) was a Turkish footballer. He played for Samsunspor. 

Gürsu started his professional career with Samsunspor during the 1992-93 season, and won the Turkish Second League (now Turkish Bank Asya First League) in his first year with the club. In his second season, they finished Turkish Super League 5th and won Balkan Cup with his team-mates Cenk İşler, Ahmet Yıldırım, Ertuğrul Sağlam and Daniel Timofte. 

He played as Ronald Koeman and his nickname was Koeman Müjdat

He played for Turkey U21 alongside Rüştü Reçber, Alpay Özalan, Arif Erdem, Ergün Penbe, Hakan Şükür, Sergen Yalçın, Abdullah Ercan and Emre Aşık.

He died in a traffic accident in Antalya. His nephew Müjdat Gürsu (had same name with him) also died in another traffic accident in 2009

Honours
1993 Turkish Second League Champion Samsunspor
1994 Balkan Cup Champion with Samsunspor

External links
Player profil on TFF.org

References

1971 births
1994 deaths
Turkish footballers
Turkey under-21 international footballers
Samsunspor footballers
Süper Lig players
Road incident deaths in Turkey
People from Silivri
Association football midfielders